The Uzama also known as King Makers in the Benin Kingdom, are among the highest ranking chiefs in Benin History. Just like the Oyomesi of the old Oyo empire, the Uzama are saddled with the responsibility of crowning a new king in the Benin Kingdom (modern day Benin City). From ancient Benin History, the Uzama reign started during the Ogiso era and they consist of four chiefs which is headed by Chief Oliha. Other chiefs holding the Uzama title include Edohen, Ero and Eholo Nire. While the Chiefs were responsible for crowning the King or the Oba of Benin, they do not have the power to choose the king.

See also 
Kingdom of Benin

Oba of Benin

List of the Ogiso

References 

Edo people